David Earl Prichard (November 27, 1963 – February 28, 1990) was an American guitarist mainly known as a member of the heavy metal band Armored Saint.

Biography
In 1982, Prichard co-founded Armored Saint along with the brothers Phil Sandoval (guitar) and Gonzo Sandoval (drums), and stayed with the band until his death in 1990. He played on the band's first EP Armored Saint (1983), first three studio albums, March of the Saint (1984), Delirious Nomad (1985) and Raising Fear (1987), as well as the live album Saints Will Conquer (1988).

In 1989, as Armored Saint was preparing for their fourth studio album Symbol of Salvation, Prichard was diagnosed with leukemia and died of the disease the following year at the age of 26. The album was dedicated to the spirit and memory of Dave Prichard, whose solo on the demo recording of the song "Tainted Past" was painstakingly and carefully transferred and used on the album.

References 

1963 births
1990 deaths
American heavy metal guitarists
Guitarists from California
Armored Saint members
Deaths from leukemia
20th-century American guitarists
Deaths from cancer in the United States